Allenrolfea occidentalis, the iodine bush, is a low-lying shrub of the Southwestern United States, California, Idaho, and northern Mexico.

It grows in sandy, often salty, distinctly alkaline soils, such as desert washes and saline dry lakebeds.  It is a common halophyte member of the alkali flat ecosystem.

Description
The knobby green stems are fleshy and appear jointed at the internodes between segments.  Often the segments are so short they are nearly round. The leaves appear as flaky scales scattered across the surface of the stems. The genus was named for the English botanist Robert Allen Rolfe.

The seeds of iodinebush have been used as food in North America in prehistory.

References

Further reading
Gul, B., D. J. Weber, and M. A. Khan. (2001). Growth, ionic and osmotic relations of an Allenrolfea occidentalis population in an inland salt playa of the Great Basin Desert. Journal of Arid Environments 48(4) 445–60.

External links

Jepson Manual Treatment
USDA Plants Profile
Photo gallery

Amaranthaceae
Halophytes
Flora of the Southwestern United States
Flora of Northwestern Mexico
Flora of Idaho
Flora of the Northwestern United States
Flora of California
Flora of the California desert regions
Flora of the Sonoran Deserts
Flora of the Great Basin
Plants described in 1871
Taxa named by Sereno Watson
Flora without expected TNC conservation status